The 5th Rivers State House of Assembly was in session from 29 May 2003 until 28 May 2007. All members of the House were elected on 3 May 2003. The majority party was the Rivers State People's Democratic Party led by Uche Secondus. The presiding officer (Speaker) of the Assembly was Chibuike Amaechi.

Members

Sources

Rivers State House of Assembly
2003 establishments in Nigeria
2000s establishments in Rivers State
2007 disestablishments in Nigeria
2000s disestablishments in Rivers State